Giselda Leirner (born 1928) is a Brazilian writer, illustrator, and plastic artist. She was born in São Paulo, Brazil. Her works have been exhibited at São Paulo Museum of Art.

Leirner went to the Art Students League and the Parsons The New School for Design in New York City where she took classes with Emiliano Di Cavalcanti, Yolanda Mohalyi and Poty Lazarotto. She earned a bachelor's degree in philosophy at the Universidade de São Paulo and has a master's degree in philosophy of religion.

Books
A Filha de Kafka contos, Ed. Massao Hono, Brasil (trad. fr. de Monique Le Moing :La Fille de Kafka, Ed.Joelle  Loesfeld, Gallimard)
Nas Aguas do mesmo Rio, Ateliê Editora,  Brasil
O Nono Mês, Brasil
" Naufragios " Editora 34, Brasil

References

1928 births
Living people
Brazilian illustrators
Brazilian women illustrators
Brazilian women writers
Brazilian writers
Jewish Brazilian writers
Jewish women writers
Brazilian expatriates in the United States